Sedgefield Country Club is a country club in the eastern United States, located in Greensboro, North Carolina, southwest of the city center. Established in 1925, it is primarily known for its golf course and the PGA Tour event it has held since 2008: the Wyndham Championship, formerly the Greater Greensboro Chrysler Classic, and the Greater Greensboro Open (GGO). It also hosted the tournament from 1938 to 1976 (alternating some years with Starmount Forest Country Club).    

The course was designed by Donald Ross and opened for play in 1926. Along with Detroit Golf Club, they are currently the only two Ross-designed courses hosting a regular event on the PGA Tour. The Ross course consisted of Bentgrass greens until a major $3 million restoration project initiated in 2007, which added Champion Bermuda  greens and restored its rolling fairways. In 2011, Mcconnell Golf acquired Sedgefield and added new membership benefits, including reciprocal access to the 14 other Mcconnell Golf properties.  

From 2003 until 2021, Rocky Brooks of the PGA served as director of golf at Sedgefield. He was succeeded by Eric Ferguson who now serves as the director of golf.

References

External links

PGA Tour site for the Wyndham Championship

Golf clubs and courses in North Carolina
Sports venues in Guilford County, North Carolina
1925 establishments in North Carolina
Sports venues completed in 1925